Danielle de Niese (born 11 April 1979) is an Australian-American lyric soprano. After success as a young child in singing competitions in Australia, she moved to the United States where she developed an operatic career. From 2005 she came to widespread public attention with her performances as Cleopatra in Giulio Cesare at Glyndebourne, England.

Early life
De Niese was born in Melbourne, Victoria, Australia, after her parents, Chris and Beverly, had migrated from Sri Lanka to Australia as teenagers. She is a Sri Lankan Burgher with some Dutch and Scottish heritage. In 1988, at the age of nine, she became the youngest winner of the Australian TV talent competition, Young Talent Time. In the competition, she was singing a Whitney Houston medley, for which the prize was A$ 5,000 and a Yamaha baby grand piano, which she still owns.

In 1990, her family moved to Los Angeles, where she became a regular guest host of the TV programme L.A. Kids for which she won an Emmy Award at the age of 16.

Career
De Niese made her professional operatic debut at the age of 15 with the Los Angeles Opera. She became the youngest singer ever to participate in the Young Artists Studio at the Metropolitan Opera, where she debuted in 1998 at the age of 19 as Barbarina in a new production of The Marriage of Figaro directed by Jonathan Miller and conducted by James Levine. She studied voice privately with Ruth Falcon, and at the Mannes College of Music in Manhattan.

Ridley Scott's 2001 film Hannibal features a scene from Dante's La Vita Nuova; in it, de Niese sings as the character Beatrice the song "Vide Cor Meum" by Patrick Cassidy. She was subsequently asked to perform the title role in the Met's production of Maurice Ravel's L'enfant et les sortilèges. Other Met roles include Cleopatra in Giulio Cesare (2007), Euridice in Orfeo ed Euridice (2009), and Susanna in the same production of The Marriage of Figaro in which she sang Barbarina in 1998.

She has appeared in productions of a number of Baroque operas on stage and on DVD, including the Les Arts Florissants production of Les Indes galantes by Jean-Philippe Rameau, and as Cleopatra in Giulio Cesare, directed by David McVicar, at Glyndebourne in 2005, 2006 and 2009, and in the same production at the Lyric Opera of Chicago in 2007.

At the end of 2006, when De Nederlandse Opera staged the three Mozart-Da Ponte operas conducted by Ingo Metzmacher, de Niese sang Susanna in The Marriage of Figaro and Despina in Così fan tutte. In 2009, de Niese made her Covent Garden debut in The Royal Opera's production of Handel's Acis and Galatea, directed by choreographer Wayne McGregor and recorded on DVD.

Beginning on 31 December 2011 and continuing through January 2012, de Niese appeared as Ariel in The Enchanted Island, a pastiche opera created by Jeremy Sams for the Metropolitan Opera. The performance on 21 January was broadcast worldwide as a MET HD video transmission. She has subsequently returned to the Met as Cleopatra in Handel's Giulio Cesare (2013), Despina in Così fan tutte (2013) and Susanna in The Marriage of Figaro (2014).

In March 2012 de Niese appeared as Norina in Don Pasquale at the San Diego Opera. She performed that role again the following year at the Glyndebourne Festival Opera. In November 2013 she portrayed Poppaea in Handel's Agrippina at the Liceu. In 2014 she appeared as the title heroine in Francesco Cavalli's La Calisto at the Bavarian State Opera, sang Anne Trulove in The Rake's Progress at the Teatro Regio di Turino, and performed the title role in Handel's Partenope at the San Francisco Opera.

In February 2015 de Niese sang Susanna in The Marriage of Figaro at the Hamburg State Opera. In August 2015 she returned to the Glyndebourne Festival Opera in performances of Concepción in L'heure espagnole and the title role in Ravel's L'enfant et les sortilèges. In December 2015 she created the role of Roxane Coss in the world premiere of Jimmy López's opera Bel Canto at the Lyric Opera of Chicago.

2017 saw her stage debut in Australia as Hanna Glawari in Graeme Murphy's production of The Merry Widow for Opera Australia in performances at the Arts Centre Melbourne and the Sydney Opera House, conducted by Vanessa Scammell.

In September 2018, she was featured as the castaway on long-running BBC Radio 4 programme, Desert Island Discs.

In 2019 she played Aldonza/Dulcinea in Man of La Mancha with English National Opera at the London Coliseum opposite Kelsey Grammer as Cervantes/Quixote, Peter Polycarpou as Sancho, and Nicholas Lyndhurst as the Governor/Innkeeper.

In February 2020 she created the title role in the world premiere of Eurydice, written by Matthew Aucoin with a libretto by Sarah Ruhl, at the Los Angeles Opera.

Albums
 Semele (2004)
 Handel Arias (2008)
 Raaff (2009)
 The Mozart Album (2009)
 Diva (2010)
 Beauty of the Baroque (2011), with Andreas Scholl, The English Concert conducted by Harry Bicket

Personal life
De Niese (called Danni by her friends and colleagues) married Gus Christie, grandson of John Christie and chairman of Glyndebourne Festival Opera, on 19 December 2009 in St Bartholomew-the-Great, London. Since her marriage she has lived at Glyndebourne in Sussex, England. The couple have two children.

In 2015 she was invited to become a Patron of the Australian performing arts charity, the Tait Memorial Trust

References

External links
 
 Opera Lively interview
 
 Classical Archives Interview (regionally restricted access)
 , NPR Music, (Le) Poisson Rouge, "Let the bright Seraphim" from Samson, "Come Again" and "What if I never speed?" by John Dowland, "Quel sguardo sdegnosetto" by Claudio Monteverdi
  – Danielle de Niese: A flirtatious aria (TEDGlobal 2011)
 Streamopera.com/Danielle de Niese 

1979 births
Living people
Singers from Melbourne
Singers from Los Angeles
Australian operatic sopranos
American operatic sopranos
Australian expatriates in the United States
Australian expatriates in the United Kingdom
Australian people of Sri Lankan descent
Mannes School of Music alumni
Sri Lankan people of Dutch descent
21st-century American singers
21st-century Australian singers
21st-century American women singers
Classical musicians from California